Palas (also Romanized as Palās, Pālās, Pelās, and Pelas; also known as Pakas and Pilās) is a village in Alvand Rural District, in the Central District of Khorramdarreh County, Zanjan Province, Iran. At the 2006 census, its population was 119, in 27 families.

References 

Populated places in Khorramdarreh County